Sellerio Editore is an Italian publisher founded in 1969 in Palermo, by Elvira Giorgianni and her husband Enzo Sellerio, encouraged by the writer Leonardo Sciascia and the anthropologist Antonino Buttitta.

History 
After some titles published in the first collection, of suggestive name La civiltà perfezionata (The improved civilization), the publisher gained visibility with the publication in 1978 of Leonardo Sciascia’s L'affaire Moro (The case Aldo Moro).
From then on the number of collections grows, starting with La memoria (The memory), today practically a symbol of the italian publisher.

Among the writers who have collaborated with the publishing house: Gesualdo Bufalino, launched in 1981, winner of the Campiello Prize and Strega Prize and Andrea Camilleri ("father" of Montalbano).

From 1983 onwards Elvira Sellerio started to dedicate herself only to narrative and essay publications while Enzo Sellerio started to take care of art and photography publications. Among the collections that have gradually been constituted are also specialized series, such as La città antica (The ancient city), from classical culture, and the Sicilian Library of History and Literature (Sicilian Library of history and letteratura).

By 2020 the Sellerio catalog has more than three thousand titles.

After the death of Elvira Sellerio in 2010 the publisher continues to be under the direction of the founder Enzo Sellerio, together with his son Antonio and Olivia Sellerio, in addition to the researcher Salvatore Silvano Nigro.

Italian writers 

Luisa Adorno
Sebastiano Aglianò
Giulio Angioni
Maria Attanasio
Sergio Atzeni
Gesualdo Bufalino
Davide Camarrone
Andrea Camilleri
Luciano Canfora
Gianrico Carofiglio
Vincenzo Consolo
Ugo Cornia
Augusto De Angelis
Marco Ferrari
Pietro Grossi
Carlo Lucarelli
Marco Malvaldi
Antonio Manzini
Lorenza Mazzetti
Giovanni Merenda
Maria Messina
Andrea Molesini
Angelo Morino
Laura Pariani
Santo Piazzese
Alessandro Robecchi
Francesco Recami
Federico Maria Sardelli
Gaetano Savatteri
Furio Scarpelli
Giorgio Scerbanenco
Leonardo Sciascia
Adriano Sofri
Fabio Stassi
Antonio Tabucchi
Turi Vasile
Giosuè Calaciura

Authors translated into Italian 

Héctor Bianciotti
Roberto Bolaño
Sergej Donatovič Dovlatov
Margaret Doody
Alicia Giménez Bartlett
Friedrich Glauser
Geoffrey Holiday Hall
Nathaniel Hawthorne
Dominique Manotti
Manuel Vázquez Montalbán
Ben Pastor
Vincent Schiavelli
Maj Sjöwall
Per Wahlöö
Anthony Trollope
José Maria Eça de Queirós

Book series 

La memoria
La rosa dei venti 
Il contesto
Il divano
Alle 8 di sera
Nuovo prisma
La nuova diagonale
Galleria
Le indagini di Montalbano
Biblioteca siciliana di storia e letteratura
Corti
Il castello
Il gioco delle parti. Romanzi giudiziari
Il mare
La diagonale
Le parole e le cose
Tutto e subito
Fine secolo
Quaderni della Biblioteca siciliana di storia e letteratura
L'Italia
La città antica
 Teatro
 Nuovo Museo
 L'isola
 La civiltà perfezionata
 Fantascienza
 Prisma
 Museo
 La pietra vissuta
 Le favole mistiche
 Fuori collana
 App
 Narrativa per la scuola
 La memoria illustrata
 I cristalli
 I cristallini
 Varia
 Cataloghi
 Bel vedere
 Diorama
 L'occhio di vetro
 La Cuba

Television series based on Sellerio books 
 Inspector Montalbano –  Le indagini di Montalbano 
 The Young Montalbano – La memoria

References 

Book publishing companies of Italy
Companies based in Palermo
Italian brands
Companies based in Sicily